Gerenkova is a small town in the District of İncirliova, Aydın Province, Turkey. As of 2010 it had a population of 2066 people.

References

Villages in İncirliova District